The  was the European-style men's civil attire introduced in Japan in 1940 during World War II.

Its similarity to a military uniform was one of the reasons for heavy casualties among Japanese civilians when the Soviet army attacked in 1945.

References

Japanese full-body garments
Japanese words and phrases
Folk costumes
History of Asian clothing